The Bajaj Pulsar NS200, previously known as Bajaj Pulsar 200NS, is a sports bike made by Indian motorcycle manufacturer Bajaj Auto. "NS" stands for Naked Sports.

History 
Bajaj Automotive launched the Pulsar 200NS in 2012 December. It later discontinued the 200NS, improved the performance and relaunched the 200NS in 2017 as NS200. The motorcycle is now available with single channel ABS and two new colours: white and black. This new white colour scheme was a popular choice among younger drivers. Its present top competitors are the TVS Apache RTR 2004V and KTM Duke 200.

Design 
The NS200 is a street-fighter style motorcycle and well known for its wolf like look. It offers a digital instrument cluster and an upright seating position. It has a single-cylinder, four-stroke, triple spark-ignition & liquid-cooled engine. It uses a pressed steel perimeter frame and a box section swingarm, and has an underbelly exhaust, and rear nitrox-charged mono-shock suspension.

References

External links

Pulsar
Motorcycles introduced in 2012